Edwin Maka (born 25 February 1993) is a New Zealand-born Tongan rugby union player. His position is Number 8 and he currently plays for Bayonne in the Top 14.

Mother is Malia Lesina Kelela Latu from the village of Koloua-'o-Kolomotu'a / Tofoa, Tonga and his father is Fisipuna Maka from the village of Longoteme.

He is the nephew of former Tonga international Finau Maka and former All Black and former Tonga coach Isitolo Maka. Edwin joined Toulouse in 2012 from Australia and signed a two-year contract, which was extended to five years after he made his debut in August 2012.

References

1993 births
Living people
Tongan rugby union players
Rugby union players from Auckland
Stade Toulousain players
Rugby union number eights
New Zealand sportspeople of Tongan descent
New Zealand expatriate rugby union players
Expatriate rugby union players in France
New Zealand expatriate sportspeople in France
Racing 92 players
Aviron Bayonnais players